Matt Paweski (born 1980, Detroit, US) is an American sculptor who lives and works in Los Angeles. His sculptures sit between sculpture and functional design, referencing carpentry and furniture making.

Background
Paweski was born in Detroit, US, in 1980. He completed his BFA at Arizona State University in Tempe, US in 2005 before earning his MFA in Fine Art from the Art Center College of Design, Pasadena, US, graduating in 2009.

Exhibitions
Paweski's work has been exhibited at Palais de Tokyo, Paris, Arizona State University Art Museum, Tempe, Phoenix Art Museum, Phoenix, US, Santa Monica College, California, ArtCenter College of Design, Pasadena and OCTAGON, Milan.

References

1980 births
Living people
Artists from Detroit
Artists from Los Angeles
Arizona State University alumni
21st-century American sculptors
Sculptors from Michigan